Pääsküla station (Estonian: Pääsküla raudteepeatus, previous Russian name was Petrovskaja Sloboda until 1919) is a railway station in Pääsküla in Nõmme district of Tallinn, Estonia, approximately 11 kilometers (6,8 mi) southwest from the Baltic station (Estonian: Balti jaam) which is the main railway station of Tallinn, near the Baltic Sea. The Pääsküla railway station is located between Kivimäe and Laagri railway stops of Tallinn-Keila railway. The station was opened in 1915.

There are two platforms along the three-lane railway, both 150 meters long. Elron's electric trains from Tallinn to Keila, Paldiski, Turba and Klooga-Rand stop at Pääsküla station. The station belongs to the Zone I, within which traffic is free for Tallinners.

The main railway depot of Estonia is located nearby the Pääsküla station.

Pääsküla railway station serves the Pääsküla sub-district which has approximately 9800 residents.

There is a possibility to transfer to bus line 27 and 20 at nearby bus station on Pärnu maantee. Bus station for bus line 14, 18 and 18A is about 500 meters from the Pääsküla railway station on Vabaduse puiestee.

In 1916 a wooden station building was completed and the first story of the building was added in 1926.

Ticket sales in the station building ended in 1997.

In 2020, there were approximately 58 train departures per day at Pääsküla railway station towards Tallinn city center.

See also
 List of railway stations in Estonia
 Rail transport in Estonia

References

External links

 Official website of Eesti Raudtee (EVR) – the national railway infrastructure company of Estonia  responsible for maintenance and traffic control of most of the Estonian railway network
 Official website of Elron – the national passenger train operating company of Estonia operating all domestic passenger train services

Railway stations in Estonia